Politics is a 1931 American pre-Code comedy film directed by Charles Reisner and written by Wells Root and Robert E. Hopkins. The film stars Marie Dressler, Polly Moran, Roscoe Ates, Karen Morley, and William Bakewell. It was released on July 25, 1931 by Metro-Goldwyn-Mayer.

Plot
Crime runs rampant in Lake City and the corrupt mayor is running for another term of office. It appears as though he will win until the disgusted women of the town back homebody Hattie Burns to run against him.

Cast
Marie Dressler as Hattie Burns
Polly Moran as Ivy Higgins
Roscoe Ates as Peter Higgins 
Karen Morley as Myrtle Burns
William Bakewell as Benny Emerson
John Miljan as Jim Curango
Joan Marsh as Daisy Evans
Tom McGuire as Mayor Tom Collins
Kane Richmond as Nifty Morgan
Mary Alden as Mrs. Mary Evans

References

External links

1931 films
1931 comedy films
American black-and-white films
American comedy films
Films directed by Charles Reisner
Metro-Goldwyn-Mayer films
1930s English-language films
1930s American films